Rick Leach and Brian MacPhie were the defending champions, but did not participate this year.

Bob Bryan and Mike Bryan won in the final 6–2, 6–4, against Eric Butorac and Jamie Murray.

Seeds

Draw

Draw

External links
Draw

Los Angeles Open (tennis)
2006 ATP Tour